In 2003, Nigeria adopted the Child Rights Act to domesticate the Convention on the Rights of the Child. The Children's Rights Act of 2003 expands the human rights bestowed to citizens in Nigeria's 1999 constitution to children. Although this law was passed at the Federal level, it is only effective if State assemblies also codify the law. The bill was first introduced in 2002, but did not pass because of opposition from the Supreme Council for Shari'a.  The act was officially passed into law in 2003 by Former President Chief Olusegun Obansanjo as the Children's Rights Act 2003, in large part because of the media pressure that national stakeholder and international organizations put on the National Assembly.

Contents 
The Child Rights Act itself is 230 pages long and contains 278 different sections.

Part I- mandates that when a child is concerned, their best interest is to take precedent. It goes on to state that the parent or legal guardian is obligated to fulfill the duty to give the child basic protection.

Part II- specifies that the Article IV of Nigeria's 1999 constitution and any other federal law which details fundamental rights should be seen as being part of the act. This article details the rights, freedoms and responsibilities of children. It goes on to state specific rights for children including the right to: survival, a name, family life, private life, dignity, recreation, cultural activities,  health services, and education.

Part III- discusses the ways in which a child shall be protected. These include protection from child marriage as well as the punishments for the act to the adult parties involved. Other protections include: not being harmed (including being marked with tattoos) or from sexual violence, being shielded from exploitative labor, or being enlisted in any military operation.

Part IV- lists the reasons when a child assessment order may be sought as well as the reasons and duration which emergency protection orders shall be given to a child. It is also made clear the obligations of a state government when it is disclosed to that institution that a child is being harmed.

Part V- indicates the circumstances in which a child shall be brought to court in order to determine if they need protection. This part also stipulates the type of person who shall be allowed to make such a decision using the guidelines detailed in this section.

Part VI- enumerates the ways and manner in which a court must proceed after a child assessment order is made.  

Part VII- allows for the court to use paternity tests in order to make decisions in civil proceedings when it is unclear who the parents of a child are.

Part VIII- shows how decisions should be made about custody of a child.

Part IX- details who is allowed guardianship and the ways in which guardianship may be transferred from one adult to another over a child.

Part X- establishes how a child becomes a ward of the court, that there may be payments required of a previous guardian for the “maintenance” of their child, and the rules regarding how a child may be released back into the custody of a guardian.

Part XI- outlines the circumstances in which a child may be fostered, the way in which an adult may apply to foster a child, and the rules the adult fostering the child must adhere to.

Part XII- requires that each state of Nigeria create a system for adoption services. This section also outlines the process of applying for adoption and stipulates that the person wishing to adopt a child must reside within the state that the child already lives.

Part XIII- creates a system of family courts with two levels, establishes a right to legal counsel for all children, and devises safe guards (such as the withholding of the child's name, school pictures or any identifying features) within a trial which are meant to protect the child.

Part XIV- mandates that every state creates a registry which shall track the names of the children being supervised as well as the names of the individual nannies or day care providers who are tasked with watching the children. This clause also grants the government the power to inspect any premise in which “child minding” occurs.

Part XV- outlines that the instances where a state's government is required to step in to protect the welfare of children.

Part XVI-XVIII - indicates the types of housing that may be established to house children: community homes (or housing for children who are under the care of the government or not), voluntary homes, and registered children's homes.

Part XIX- establishes that a minister may grant the inspection on children's homes for the reasons listed in the clause.

Part XX- grants children the right to privacy in the court system. This section also makes it clear that children are to be tried through the child justice system and not the courts where adults are tried. It's indicated that within the Nigerian Police Force, there must be individuals trained specifically to handle children. From a child's arrest to their treatment in an institution, this section outlines the procedures.

Part XXI- show the ways in which “supervision officers” are appointed as well as the duties of the specially appointed officers.

Part XXII- specifies that this act allows for the minister to create specific institutions meant to meet the needs of children. These centres include (but are not limited to): Children Residential Centres, Emergency Protection Centres, and a Children Correction Centres.

Part XXIII- creates the National Child Rights Implementation Committee which must consist of one representative from fourteen of Nigeria's government bodies. The function of the committee is to take actions which will lead to the observance of the act itself as well as other human rights treaties Nigeria has signed onto.

Part XXIV- is labeled as “miscellaneous” and touches on some of the legal implications any corporations may face for not following this act. This section also further defines terms.

Implementation 
As of 2016, the Child Rights Act was codified into law in 24 of Nigeria's 36 states, with Enugu being the most recent to enact the law in December 2016.

In order to enforce Act, The National Child Rights Implementation Committee was created. Committees were also established for some of the states which have ratified the act. The committee listed five top priorities for addressing the needs of children: establishing safe water supply and sanitation, working on the HIV/AIDs epidemic, creating job opportunities for women so they are better able to take care of the children, providing universal basic education, and making the primary health care system better. A 2010 report notes that the capacity for monitoring and sufficiently implementing the act is low.

Another way in which the Child Rights Act proves difficult to enforce is because it contradicts other national laws. Even though the Child Rights Acts defines a child as anyone under eighteen years old, this conflicts with another Nigerian Law, the Young Person's Act, which designates a child as an individual below the age of fourteen. In contrast, The Young Person's Acts deems individuals ages fourteen to seventeen "young people". The definitions created by these two separate laws are in tension with each other and pose issues in matters of interpretation. Although the provisions within the Child Rights Act should be seen as overruling any other law, the fact that the Child Rights Act is not ratified in all Nigerian States makes it difficult.

Reactions of Religious Groups 
There are two main ways religious groups approach the idea of human rights. The first is by thinking of human rights as divinely granted by god and part of the tradition. For those who practice Islam, this can be seen in the symmetry between some of the rights outlined in the Universal Declaration of Human Rights and the Quran. When it comes to the human rights of children, there are passages in the Quran and hadith which are compatible with the Child Rights Act of 2003. For example, the right to custody or guardianship is discussed in Q 65:7, the right to education is expressed in Tirmidhi, Hadith 218.

However, the second way religious groups may see human rights is as an imposition of the west that is contrary to religious or cultural practices. Although there are many ways in which Islamic Law is compatible with The Child Rights Act, as outlined above, there are five main clauses which are contrary to Islamic law within the 2003 Act. First is the clause about child marriage within Part III. In the Child Rights Act, it is stated that any marriage that a child takes part in shall be considered unlawful because children are not capable of being part of a valid marriage contract. This law contradicts the Islamic doctrine that a girl's father may betroth her without obtaining her consent. Second, in Part VIII it is established that once a child is adopted, their adoptive parent or parents are now solely responsible for the child, taking away the birth parents rights to make any decisions regarding the child. The concept of the birth parents relinquishing all rights to the child is in tension with Surrah 33:4-5, where it is stated that, children should still remain attached to their birth parents by name. Third, it is upheld in Part VIII of the Child Rights Act that in the instance that a child's parents are not married to each other when the child birth, either the mother or father can claim custody to the child. For many in the Islamic community, when a child is born out of wedlock it is a serious matter, and this clause in the Child Right's Act can be seen as much to casual. The fourth subject of tension between the Child Rights Act and the Islamic community is regarding the subject of guardianship or custody as stipulated in Part IX of the act. Islamic law generally regards the mother as the rightful steward of a child. However, the Child Rights Act considers the welfare and wants of the child as well as the capability and wishes of the parents when deciding on who is going to be the child's guardian. Lastly, the issue of withholding corporal punishment from children, as brought up in Part XX of the Child Rights Act is thought by some to be not only un-Islamic but also un-African.

Activism 
Teenage girls in Nigeria who belong to a group called Its Never Your Fault are fighting for the right not to be married before the age 18, as is stipulated in Part III of the Child Rights Act. Currently, a loophole in the constitution stipulates that upon marriage a girl is to be regarded as an adult, regardless of the child's age when she is married. As of 2018, the group has gathered over 150,000 signatures for a petition which demands that the government change the age of consent to 18 years old.

References

External links

Law of Nigeria
Children's rights in Nigeria
Children's rights in Africa
Child welfare in Nigeria